The Mamba is a South African armoured personnel carrier designed for internal security purposes. It was developed during the late 1980s to replace the Buffel in service with the South African military and security forces. The first models were built on a 4X2 Toyota Dyna chassis, which was subsequently replaced in production around 1994 by a more reliable Unimog chassis. All marks of the Mamba were designed to be mine-resistant and blastproof.

Development history

Mamba Mk1
The South African Army issued a requirement for a new armoured vehicle in 1987 capable of a wide variety of roles, namely border protection and internal security. The Mamba Mk1 was developed the following year and utilised the chassis of a Toyota Dyna 4X2 truck. A number were accepted into service between 1990 and 1994.

Subsequent marks
After 1994, the Mamba utilised a Unimog truck chassis for better off-road performance and ground clearance. The first units were derived from surplus Buffel vehicles. Its V-shaped hull is designed to deflect a mine blast away from the occupants. It is powered by a 352N Mercedes Benz 6-cylinder diesel engine. The Mamba entered service in 1995, and is still in use with the South African National Defence Force (SANDF) and several other countries. The SANDF now uses the Mamba Mk2 and Mamba Mk3 versions, with 600 Mk2s upgraded to Mk3 configuration.

The four-wheeled vehicle can carry up to 10 passengers, excluding the driver. A roof hatch allows a gunner to use the weapon mount, which can be equipped with a 12.7 mm machine gun. A large door at the rear of the vehicle provides access to the passengers and crew. The Mk3 features better ballistic protection over the Mk2 – the latter can withstand impacts from up to 7.62×51mm NATO rounds, while the former is capable of handling 5.56×45mm NATO impacts. The Mk3 is also lighter, more stable, has lower operating costs and comes with an 8-speed transmission compared to the 4-speed transmission of the Mk2. Apart from the APC role, the vehicle may also be used as an ambulance, a command vehicle, a VIP transport, or a logistics vehicle. The newest Mamba, the Mk5, is manufactured by N4-Trucks in South Africa, and delivers  from a water-cooled Iveco engine, a range over 600 km, over 4,500 kg payload, and a B7 ballistic protection versus previous B6 capabilities of the Mk1-Mk3.

Combat history

Mambas have been deployed primarily with peacekeeping missions mounted by the United Nations and the African Union. The Mamba has seen active service with the United Nations Observer Mission in Angola (MONUA), the United Nations Protection Force (UNPROFOR), the United Nations Force Intervention Brigade (FIB), and the British contingent of the Kosovo Force. During the Iraq War, it was widely deployed by private security contractors in Iraq.

Operators

: 18
: 10
: 14
: 25
: 10
: 23
: 5
: 6

: 6
: 87
: 15
: 14
: 3
 Unknown quantity
: 7

Variants and derivatives

Numerous variants of the Mamba have been produced, as well as vehicles derived from it.
 Mamba Mk1 - Original 2x4 (Over 500 built by TFM Industries later becomes Reumech OMC)
 Springbuck Mk1 -  modified version
 Reva Mk1 -  modified version by ICP
 Puma - modified version with a Toyota Dyna 7-145 powerplant and drivetrain
 Mamba Mk2 - 4x4 (built by Sandock Austral and TFM) Mamba Mk II - Improved production version.
 Mamba Mk2 EE - Version produced for the Estonian Army
 Mamba Mk2 SW - Version produced for the Swedish Army
 Komanche - A short wheeled base (SWB) version which can carry up to 7 troops
 Sabre - 4 man cab with a cargo area in the rear
 Alvis 4 - Version produced by Alvis UK for the British Army
 Alvis 8 - Komanche SWB version produced by Alvis UK for the British Army
 RG-31 Nyala - redesigned version by TFM
 Romad  - modified version by Sandock Austral)
 Reva Mk2 -  modified version by ICP with Cummins powerplant
Springbuck Mk2 - modified version
Mamba Mk3 - 4x4 version fitted with Mercedes Benz 312N engine. Built by Alvis OMC
 Reva Mk3 -  modified version by ICP
Mamba Mk5 - 4x4 fitted with Iveco Euro 3 engine and B7 armor. Built by Osprea Logistics SA
Mamba Mk7 - 4x4 fitted with Deutz BF6L9l4C Turbo engine and B7 steel and glass; upgrade to Stanag 3- with 0.50 Cal protection. Built by Osprea Logistics
 Mamba Mk7-X - * - 4x4 fitted with a Deutz BF06M1015C with 408 HP water-cooled engine. STANAG 4a4b blast protection and STANAG 3- ballistic protection. Built by

See also
 Mine-resistant ambush protected vehicles
 List of AFVs
 Buffel
 RCV-9
 Reva APC - similar vehicle produced by Integrated Convoy Protection.
 RG-12
 RG-19
 RG-31
 RG-32
 RG-33
 RG-34
 RG-35

References

External links

 Mamba Armored Personnel Carrier - Military Today

Armoured personnel carriers of South Africa
Military trucks
Paramilitary vehicles
Military vehicles introduced in the 1990s
Wheeled armoured personnel carriers
Armoured personnel carriers of the Cold War
Armoured personnel carriers of the post–Cold War period